Eye field may refer to:

Frontal eye fields, a region located in the prefrontal cortex
Medial eye fields, areas in the frontal lobe of a primate brain
Supplementary eye fields, areas on the dorsal-medial surface of the frontal lobe of a primate brain